Kenneth Meade Lakin (January 14, 1941 - November 24, 2014) was a U.S. physicist credited as the inventor of the solidly mounted resonator (SMR).

Biography 
He was born in Grand Rapids, Michigan. He died at home in Redmond, Oregon, on November 24, 2012, from prostate cancer.

See also 
 Thin-film bulk acoustic resonator

References 

1941 births
2014 deaths
American physicists
People from Grand Rapids, Michigan
People from Redmond, Oregon
Stanford University alumni